North Algona Wilberforce is a township municipality in Renfrew County, Ontario, Canada. It has a population of 2,873. The township was formed in 1999 when the North Algona and Wilberforce townships were amalgamated.

Wilberforce Township was named in 1851, to honour William Wilberforce.

Communities
The township contains the communities of Allans Corners, Beef Town, Budd Mills, Crooked Rapids, Deacon, Dore Bay, Duquette's Farm, Fourth Chute, Germanicus, Golden Lake, Green Lake, Higginson's Hill, Lake Dore, Lett's Corners, Mink Lake, Mud Lake, Rankin, Slabtown, Trevor Ouellette Lake and Woito.

The town of Fourth Chute is the fourth of five chutes along the Bonnechere River. The others being Castleford, Renfrew, Douglas and Eganville. The chutes used were for moving timber past rapids and waterfalls.

Transportation
Canadian National Railway served Golden Lake on the Algonquin and Locksley subdivisions.  Rail service was discontinued in 1961 on the Locksley Subdivision. The Algonquin Subdivision was broken in 1933 due to an unsafe trestle in the Algonquin Park at Cache Lake. The section east of the break became the Renfrew Subdivision, which maintained service until 1984.  The grades of both lines now serve at trails for snow machines, ATVs and bicycles.

The township is served by Ontario Highway 41 and Ontario Highway 60.

Demographics 

Mother tongue:
 English as first language: 92.5%
 French as first language: 2.9%
 English and French as first language: 0.0%
 Other as first language: 4.6%

See also

 List of townships in Ontario

References

External links 

Lower-tier municipalities in Ontario
Municipalities in Renfrew County
Township municipalities in Ontario